Elynor Megan Bäckstedt-Calvert (born 6 December 2001) is a Welsh professional racing cyclist, who currently rides for UCI Women's WorldTeam . At the 2019 UCI Road World Championships in Yorkshire, England, she won the bronze medal in the women's junior time trial event, repeating her achievement from the previous World Championships.

Biography
Born in Pontypridd, Bäckstedt trains in the Pontyclun and Cardiff area. Her parents Magnus Bäckstedt and Megan Hughes were both professional cyclists, and she is the elder sister of Zoë Bäckstedt.

Major results

2018
 2nd Road race, National Junior Road Championships
 3rd  Time trial, UCI Junior Road World Championships
2019
 UEC European Junior Track Championships
1st  Individual pursuit
1st  Madison (with Sophie Lewis)
2nd  Team pursuit
 1st  Overall EPZ Omloop van Borsele Juniors
1st  Points classification
1st Stages 1 (ITT) & 2
 1st Gent–Wevelgem Junioren
 UCI Junior Track World Championships
2nd  Individual pursuit
2nd  Madison (with Sophie Lewis)
3rd  Team pursuit
 2nd Overall Healthy Ageing Tour Juniors
 2nd Road race, National Junior Road Championships
 UCI Junior Road World Championships
3rd  Time trial
5th Road race
2022
 2nd Time trial, National Under-23 Road Championships
 5th Road race, National Road Championships

Personal life
On 23 July 2021, Bäckstedt announced her engagement to Charley Calvert, a fellow British professional cyclist.

References

External links
 

2001 births
Living people
Welsh female cyclists
Sportspeople from Pontypridd
Welsh people of Swedish descent